Divisional court may refer to:

Divisional Court (England and Wales)
Ontario Superior Court of Justice#The Divisional Court